Hu Chunhua (born 1 April 1963) is a Chinese politician, a former member of the Politburo of the Chinese Communist Party (CCP), and a Vice Premier of the People's Republic of China in Premier Li Keqiang's Cabinet. He worked in Tibet for much of his career and ascended the party ranks partly through the Communist Youth League. He is popularly known as "little Hu" due to the similarities of his career with that of former CCP General Secretary Hu Jintao (no relation). He became China's youngest governor when he took the position in Hebei province in 2008. He was then promoted to Communist Party secretary of Inner Mongolia in 2009. In 2012, he was named Communist Party secretary of Guangdong and entered the CCP Politburo.

Biography

Tibet, Hebei, and Youth League
Hu was born into a family of farmers in Wufeng County, Yichang, Hubei province in 1963. In 1979, he ranked first in the county for the Gaokao examination. At age 16, he was the youngest in his class. He received his B.A. degree from Peking University in August 1983, majoring in Chinese language and literature. After graduation, he went to work in Tibet, starting as a cadre in the Organization Department of the Communist Youth League. Hu subsequently held various government and Youth League positions in Tibet, ultimately serving as deputy secretary of the CCP Tibet Autonomous Regional Committee from November 2003 to November 2006 and vice chairman of the Tibet Autonomous Regional Government from November 2003 to November 2005. In Tibet, Hu played an instrumental role in developing the Tibetan economy, curbing the independence movement, and the settlement of more Han Chinese into region.

From 1997 to 2001 Hu served in the Secretariat of the Communist Youth League and as a Vice Chairman of the All-China Youth Federation. He returned to Beijing to become the First Secretary of the Communist Youth League from December 2006 to March 2008. On April 15, 2008, he was appointed as the acting Governor of Hebei, China's youngest. On January 12, 2009, he was officially elected Governor. In Hebei, Hu had the reputation of working 'non-stop', visiting all of the province's 11 prefecture-level cities within a few months. While serving in Hebei, Hu came into the limelight during the 2008 Chinese milk scandal, which had roots in Hebei province. He came out of the incident unscathed, some say as a result of his closeness to CCP general secretary Hu Jintao. He also took part in the security preparations of the 2008 Summer Olympics in Beijing, and advocated increasing domestic consumption in response to the global financial crisis of 2007–08.

Inner Mongolia
At the 17th Party Congress in the fall of 2007, Hu Chunhua became a member of the Central Committee. In November 2009, he was appointed Regional Party Secretary of Inner Mongolia. He was also elected Chairman of the Inner Mongolia People's Congress in January 2010.

Not long after he took charge of the vast northern region, Hu embarked on a plan to rebalance growth in the region. Under Hu's predecessor Chu Bo, Inner Mongolia saw explosive GDP growth that was the result of developing natural resources. The region's GDP growth ranked highest amongst province-level entities in the country for eight consecutive years. However, the growth opened a large wealth gap, with endemic profiteering from local officials, and a divide between the resource-rich western part of the region (Hohhot, Baotou, and Ordos) and the stagnant industrial-based eastern part (Chifeng, Tongliao, Hulunbuir).

In response, Hu remarked that Inner Mongolia will no longer aspire to be ranked first in GDP growth, but rather focus on sustaining the "quality" and "efficiency" of growth. Hu believed that dogmatically pursuing a mere increase in economic output did not benefit everyone in the region, particularly farmers and nomadic herders, pointing out that the large mining projects had brought significant wealth which did not trickle down to the grassroots. He stressed that one of the priorities of his administration would be assuring equitable policies in the relocation, employment and social welfare of nomadic peoples. Hu also sought to reform tax policy to give more bargaining power to local government and local interests in assessing potential mining projects by large state-owned natural resource companies. These companies were known for running roughshod over local officials that were desperate to attract investment to boost their own GDP numbers. In urban development, Hu stressed the importance of subsidized housing.

Grievances over the intrusion of mining companies, mixed with ethnic tensions between Mongolian and Han Chinese people in the region, had caused friction for years between the government and the rural populations. It came to a boil in May 2011, when a Mongolian herder's death led to ethnic Mongolian protests in Xilinhot and unrest in other parts of the region. It was the first major protests in Inner Mongolia in more than twenty years. Hu instituted a two-pronged policy of appeasement and force, addressing the grievances of the protesting crowds by making a visit to Xilinhot, meeting with students and teachers, and promising compensation for local herders and more strict regulations over business conduct. Meanwhile, he increased security presence across Inner Mongolia, including in the capital, Hohhot, to contain the unrest.

Guangdong

In November 2012, Hu was appointed to the 18th Politburo of the Chinese Communist Party, a ruling council of China's top leaders. He, along with Sun Zhengcai, were the youngest members of the 18th politburo, raising speculation that they were being groomed to become China's next leaders in 2022. In December 2012, Hu was appointed Party Secretary of Guangdong, succeeding Wang Yang, who went on to become Vice-Premier in Beijing. The Guangdong leadership post has historically been filled by those who have gone on to join the national leadership, such as Zhao Ziyang, Xi Zhongxun, Li Changchun, Zhang Dejiang, and Wang Yang. It is widely regarded to be one of China's most important regional offices.

In Guangdong, Hu earned a reputation for being low-key, action-oriented leader who is not fond of bureaucracy or formalities. Almost immediately after his assuming the reins in Guangdong, Hu's government began a sweeping crackdown on so-called luoguan, i.e., officials who work in China but whose spouses and children live abroad. Since the beginning of Hu's term, over 800 luoguan have been disciplined, demoted, or otherwise removed from office. Hu's government also cracked down on drug trafficking and the sex industry in the Dongguan area, dispatching police to conduct massive raids of the city's prostitution venues, and removing the city's vice mayor and police chief from office.

Hu's government also began experimenting with the public release of information on the assets of local officials, and have moved to codify anti-corruption measures into law with the provincial legislature. In October 2014, Hu's government began a series of public consultations on new anti-corruption regulations.  Taking best practices from the Independent Commission Against Corruption in Hong Kong, Hu's government experimented with – in select local areas – merging the traditionally separate departments of Discipline Inspection, Supervision, Anti-Corruption, and Audit into a single agency in charge of combating graft. During's Hu's term, the Party Committee Secretary of the provincial capital Guangzhou, Wan Qingliang, was investigated for corruption and removed from office.

Public image and political future
Hu has maintained a relatively low public profile during his rise to positions of power. Hu is known for his low-key style in public, and does not discuss his private life. During the 2012 National People's Congress, Hu Chunhua only answered four out of twenty questions posed to him by reporters, casting many sensitive questions to his subordinates. When asked personal questions, he said that he was only interested in matters relating to Inner Mongolia. He refused to comment on his personal ambitions, or whether or not he had a Weibo account. Following the dismissal of Bo Xilai in April 2012, Hu was heavily promoted due to his loyalty to central party authorities under Hu Jintao's leadership. He toed the party line and is seen as a close confidant and loyalist of Hu Jintao.

After Xi Jinping assumed General Secretary of the Chinese Communist Party in 2012, Hu continued to play a prominent role politically - his record in Guangdong impressed the central authorities and was praised by Xi personally. There was wide speculation that Hu would advance directly to the CCP Politburo Standing Committee in 2017 and be groomed as a putative successor to the top leadership, but this ultimately did not occur. However, Hu was selected to become Vice-Premier in 2018, continuing to be the youngest leader among the senior-most ranks of the party. It was again speculated that Hu might join the Standing Committee in 2022, but instead he was demoted from the Politburo.  In March 2023, he was elected vice-chairperson of the 14th National Committee of the Chinese People's Political Consultative Conference.

His political beliefs about Tibet are fairly opaque. He is able to hold simple conversations in Tibetan as he had worked there as a regional official.

References 

|-

|-

|-

1963 births
Living people
Delegates to the 13th National People's Congress
Politicians from Yichang
Tuanpai
People's Republic of China politicians from Hubei
Political office-holders in Inner Mongolia
Governors of Hebei
Chinese Communist Party politicians from Hubei
Political office-holders in Tibet
Peking University alumni
Members of the 17th Central Committee of the Chinese Communist Party
Members of the 18th Central Committee of the Chinese Communist Party
Members of the 19th Central Committee of the Chinese Communist Party
Members of the 18th Politburo of the Chinese Communist Party
Members of the 19th Politburo of the Chinese Communist Party
Members of the 20th Central Committee of the Chinese Communist Party